Heartcore is an album by the Swedish duo Wildbirds & Peacedrums, released in 2007. It was recorded by the band and published by The Leaf Label.

Track listing
"Pony" – 3:18
"The Way Things Go" – 2:03
"Bird" – 2:22
"I Can't Tell in His Eyes" – 4:09
"Doubt/hope" – 3:08
"A Story from a Chair" – 3:51
"The Battle in the Water" – 3:55
"The Ones that should Save Me get Me Down" – 2:48
"Lost Love" – 4:25
"The Window" – 2:38
"Nakina" – 3:00
"We Hold Each Other Song" – 4:56

References

2007 albums
Wildbirds & Peacedrums albums
The Leaf Label albums